Groussey is a village in the commune Jullouville, in the  Manche département of Normandy, France.  It is located 600 m from the sea in the bay of Mont Saint-Michel. The nearest two villages are Carolles (to the south) and Bouillon (to the north). A coast road passes to the west (D911) from Carolles in the south through Edenville to Jullouville. Jullouville is a major seaside resort in the summer months. Groussey shares the same postal (zip) code as Jullouville, 50610.

Groussey is a tiny settlement, little more than a collection of houses bordering the road, with a couple of side roads including Impasse Des Verts Pres. It is bordered by fields to the west.

External links
Departmental Tourism page

Villages in Normandy